Croatia competed at the 2004 Summer Olympics in Athens, Greece, from 13 to 29 August 2004. This was the nation's fourth consecutive appearance at the Summer Olympics since the post-Yugoslav era. The Croatian Olympic Committee (HOO) sent the nation's smallest delegation to the Games since its debut in 1992. A total of 81 athletes, 66 men and 15 women, competed in 14 sports. Men's water polo, and men's handball were the only team-based sports in which Croatia had its representation in these Olympic Games.

The Croatian team featured three Olympic medalists from Sydney: rowers and brothers Nikša and Siniša Skelin, and four-time Olympian and defending weightlifting champion Nikolaj Pešalov in the men's lightweight class. Table tennis player and Olympic silver medalist Zoran Primorac became the first Croatian to participate in five Olympic Games as an individual athlete (his first appearance competed under the former Socialist Federal Republic of Yugoslavia). Former Bosnian athlete and discus thrower Dragan Mustapić served as the team captain and oldest member of the team at age 41, while backstroke swimmer Sanja Jovanović was youngest at age 17. Three-time Olympic water polo player and two-time medalist Dubravko Šimenc was appointed by the committee to become the nation's flag bearer in the opening ceremony.

Croatia left Athens with a total of five medals (one gold, two silver, and two bronze), being considered as the nation's most successful Olympics in history based on the overall medal tally. All of these medals were awarded for the first time to the Croatian athletes in swimming, men's coxless pair in rowing, and men's tennis doubles. Meanwhile, Croatia men's handball team (led by team captain Venio Losert) proved particularly successful in Athens, as they beat the Germans for their only gold medal at these Games, adding it to their previous record from the 1996 Summer Olympics in Atlanta.

Medalists

Athletics 

Croatian athletes have so far achieved qualifying standards in the following athletics events (up to a maximum of 3 athletes in each event at the 'A' Standard, and 1 at the 'B' Standard).

Men
Track & road events

Field events

Women
Field events

Boxing 

Croatia sent two boxers to the 2004 Summer Olympics.

Canoeing

Slalom

Sprint

Qualification Legend: Q = Qualify to final; q = Qualify to semifinal

Equestrian

Eventing

Handball

Summary

Men's tournament

Roster

Group play

Quarterfinal

Semifinal

Gold Medal Final

 Won Gold Medal

Rowing

Croatian rowers qualified the following boats:

Men

Qualification Legend: FA=Final A (medal); FB=Final B (non-medal); FC=Final C (non-medal); FD=Final D (non-medal); FE=Final E (non-medal); FF=Final F (non-medal); SA/B=Semifinals A/B; SC/D=Semifinals C/D; SE/F=Semifinals E/F; R=Repechage

Sailing

Croatian sailors have qualified one boat for each of the following events.

Men

Open

M = Medal race; OCS = On course side of the starting line; DSQ = Disqualified; DNF = Did not finish; DNS= Did not start; RDG = Redress given

Shooting 

Women

Swimming 

Croatian swimmers earned qualifying standards in the following events (up to a maximum of 2 swimmers in each event at the A-standard time, and 1 at the B-standard time):

Men

Women

Table tennis

Three Croatian table tennis players qualified for the following events.

Men

Taekwondo

Two Croatian taekwondo jin qualified for the following events.

Tennis

Croatia nominated three male and two female tennis players in the tournament.

Water polo

Men's tournament

Roster

Group play

7th-12th Classification Quarterfinal

7th-10th Classification Semifinal

9th-10th Place Classification

Weightlifting

See also
 Croatia at the 2004 Summer Paralympics
 Croatia at the 2005 Mediterranean Games

References

External links
Official Report of the XXVIII Olympiad
Croatian Olympic Committee

Nations at the 2004 Summer Olympics
2004
Summer Olympics